Philippe Decker (12 February 1840 – 9 February 1881) was a Luxembourgian composer and conductor.

1840 births
1881 deaths
19th-century composers
19th-century conductors (music)
Luxembourgian composers
Luxembourgian conductors (music)
Male conductors (music)